Joseba M. Azkarraga Rodero (born 15 November 1950) is an activist, spokesperson of the movement Sare and former Justice minister of the Basque Autonomous Community. He has been also Secretary General of Eusko Alkartasuna, from 1987 to 1993 and again from 1998 to 2009. He was formerly member of the Basque Nationalist Party. He has served as MP in the first, third and fourth periods of the Congress of Deputies in Spain.

References

1950 births
Basque Nationalist Party politicians
Eusko Alkartasuna Party politicians
Living people
Members of the 1st Congress of Deputies (Spain)
Members of the 3rd Congress of Deputies (Spain)
Members of the 4th Congress of Deputies (Spain)
People from Álava
Members of the 2nd Senate of Spain